
This is a list of the National Register of Historic Places listings in western Cincinnati, Ohio.

This is intended to be a complete list of the properties and districts on the National Register of Historic Places in western Cincinnati, Ohio, United States. Western Cincinnati is defined as being all of the city outside of downtown and west of Vine Street.  The locations of National Register properties and districts may be seen in an online map.

There are 283 properties and districts listed on the National Register in Cincinnati, including 12 National Historic Landmarks. Western Cincinnati includes 94 of these properties and districts, including 3 National Historic Landmarks; the city's remaining properties and districts are listed elsewhere.  Another 2 properties in western Cincinnati were once listed but have been removed.

Current listings

|}

Former listings

|}

See also
List of National Historic Landmarks in Ohio
National Register of Historic Places listings in Cincinnati, Ohio

Notes

References

Western